Kakdwip subdivision is an administrative subdivision of the South 24 Parganas district in the Indian state of West Bengal.

Subdivisions
South 24 Parganas district is divided into five administrative subdivisions:

12.36% of the total population of South 24 Parganas district live in Kakdwip subdivision.

Administrative units
Kakdwip subdivision has 8 police stations, 4 community development blocks, 4 panchayat samitis, 42 gram panchayats, 217 mouzas and 202 inhabited villages.

Police stations
Police stations in Kakdwip subdivision have the following features and jurisdiction:

Note:Certain portions of Kakdwip subdivision are within the jurisdiction of Dholahat PS in Diamond Harbour subdivision

.*Newly added

Blocks
Community development blocks in Kakdwip subdivision are:

Gram panchayats
The subdivision contains 42 gram panchayats under 4 community development blocks:

 Kakdwip CD block consists of eleven gram panchayats: Bapuji, Rabindra, Sri Sri Ramkrishna, Swami Bibekananda, Madhusudanpur, Ramgopalpur, Srinagar, Netaji, Rishi Bankimchandra, Suryanagar and Pratapadityanagar.
 Namkhana CD block consists of seven gram panchayats: Budhakhali, Haripur, Namkhana, Shibrampur, Frezarganj, Mausini and Narayanpur.
 Patharpratima CD block consists of fifteen gram panchayats: Achintyanagar, Dakshin Raipur, Gopalnagar, Ramganga, Banashyamnagar, Digambarpur, Herambagopalpur, Sridharnagar, Brajaballavpur, Durbachati, Laksmijanardanpur, Srinarayanpur Purnachandrapur, Dakshin Gangadharpur, G Plot and Patharpratima.
 Sagar CD block consists of nine gram panchayats: Dhablat, Dhaspara Sumatinagar II, Ghoramara, Ramkarchar, Dhaspara Sumatinagar I, Muriganga I, Rudranagar, Gangasagar and Muriganga II.

Education
South 24 Parganas district had a literacy rate of 77.51% as per the provisional figures of the census of India 2011. Alipore Sadar subdivision had a literacy rate of 81.14%, Baruipur subdivision 77.45%, Canning subdivision 70.98%, Diamond Harbour subdivision 76.26% and Kakdwip subdivision 82.04%
  
Given in the table below (data in numbers) is a comprehensive picture of the education scenario in South 24 Parganas district, with data for the year 2013-14:

.* Does not include data for portions of South 24 Parganas district functioning under Kolkata Municipal Corporation

The following institutions are located in Kakdwip subdivision:
Sundarban Mahavidyalaya was established at Kakdwip in 1965.
Sagar Mahavidyalaya was established at Harinbari in 1998.
Sibani Mandal Mahavidyalaya was established at Namkhana in 2013.
Patharpratima Mahavidyalaya was established at Patharpratima in 2001.

Healthcare
The table below (all data in numbers) presents an overview of the medical facilities available and patients treated in the hospitals, health centres and sub-centres in 2014 in South 24 Parganas district.  
 

Note: The district data does not include data for portions of South 24 Parganas district functioning under Kolkata Municipal Corporation. The number of doctors exclude private bodies.

Medical facilities in Kakdwip subdivision are as follows:

Hospitals: (Name, location, beds)

Kakdwip subdivisional hospital, Kakdwip, 100 beds

Rural Hospitals: (Name, CD block, location, beds) 

Sagar Rural Hospital, Sagar CD Block, Rudranagar, 30 beds
Dwarikanagar Rural Hospital, Namkhana CD block, Dwarikanagar, 30 beds
Madhabnagar Rural Hospital, Patharpratima CD block, Madhababnar, 30 beds

Block Primary Health Centres: (Name, CD block, location, beds)

Harendranagar Block Primary Health Centre,  Kakdwip CD block, Harendranagar, 10 beds

Primary Health Centres: (CD block-wise)(CD block, PHC location, beds)

Kakdwip CD block: Ramchandranagar (10) 
Namkhana CD block: Narayanpur (6), Maharajganj (6), Fraserganj (10), Bagdanga Mousuni (10)
Patharpratima CD block: Gadamathurpur (10), Brajballavpur (15), Indrapur (10)
Sagar CD block: Gangasagar (6), Mahendraganj (6), Muriganga (6)

Legislative Assembly Segments
As per order of the Delimitation Commission in respect of the Delimitation of constituencies in West Bengal, the areas under the Patharpratima CD Block forms the Patharpratima (Vidhan Sabha constituency). The Kakdwip CD Block, along with two gram panchayats under the Namkhana CD Block: Budhakhali and Narayanpur, will form the Kakdwip (Vidhan Sabha constituency). The other five gram panchayats under the Namkhana CD Block along with the areas covered by the Sagar CD Block will form the Sagar (West Bengal Vidhan Sabha constituency). All the three legislative assembly constituencies will be legislative assembly segments of the Mathurapur (Lok Sabha constituency), which will be reserved for Scheduled Castes (SC) candidates.

References

Subdivisions of West Bengal
Subdivisions in South 24 Parganas district
South 24 Parganas district